Katsuko (written: 克子 or 勝子) is a feminine Japanese given name. Notable people with the name include:

, Japanese volleyball player
, Japanese politician
, Japanese scientist

Japanese feminine given names